Ipswich Town Football Club have played association football since their foundation in 1878.  For every season in which they have played, a set of statistics exist for their results in a number of competitions, including competitions in English and European football.

Following the club's foundation, Ipswich Town played amateur football against teams from around Suffolk.  During the 1880s, the club played a number of matches in the Suffolk Challenge Cup, winning it three times.  Throughout the early part of the 20th century, Ipswich played in various amateur competitions including the Norfolk & Suffolk League, the South East Anglian League, the Eastern Counties League and the Southern Amateur League. Turning professional in 1936, Ipswich joined the Southern Football League before moving into the Football League by gaining entry to Division Three (South) in the 1937–38 season.

The club has won the League Championship on a single occasion, the FA Cup once, and the UEFA Cup once. This list details the club's achievements in all competitive competitions, and the top scorers for each season.

Seasons

Key

 P = Played
 W = Games won
 D = Games drawn
 L = Games lost
 F = Goals for
 A = Goals against
 Pts = Points
 Pos = Final position

 N&SL = Norfolk & Suffolk League
 EAL = East Anglian League
 SAL = Southern Amateur League
 ECL = Eastern Counties Football League
 SL = Southern League
 Div 1 = Football League First Division
 Div 2 = Football League Second Division
 Div 3(S) = Football League Third Division South
 Prem = Premier League
 Chmp = Championship
 n/a = Not applicable

 QR1 = Qualifying round 1
 QR2 = Qualifying round 2
 QR3 = Qualifying round 3
 QR4 = Qualifying round 4
 R1 = Round 1
 R2 = Round 2
 R3 = Round 3
 R4 = Round 4
 R5 = Round 5
 QF = Quarter-finals
 SF = Semi-finals

Top scorers shown in bold are players who were also top scorers in their division that season.

Footnotes

References
General
 
 

Specific

Seasons
 
Ipswich Town F.C.